James Dalgleish Hamilton Jamieson FRSE FDSE (10 September 1875 – 21 September 1966) was a Scottish dentist and author.

Life

He was born on 10 September 1875 at 52 Rankeillor Street, a ground floor and basement flat in Edinburgh’s South Side, the son of Agnes Boyd and her husband, James Jamieson (1841-1905), a surgeon. He was educated at George Watsons College. He then studied dentistry at the University of Edinburgh, graduating in 1899.

He practiced as a dental surgeon from 52 George Square in Edinburgh’s South Side 1899 to 1955, and also seemed to have lived at the same address. The building was demolished by the University of Edinburgh in the 1960s. The Royal College of Surgeons of Edinburgh awarded him an honorary doctorate in 1920. From 1930 until 1951 he lectured in dental disorders at the University of Edinburgh.

In 1938 he was elected a Fellow of the Royal Society of Edinburgh. His proposers were Francis Albert Eley Crew, Charles Henry O'Donoghue, Edwin Bramwell, and John Walton.

He died at New Malden in Surrey on 21 September 1966 aged 91. He was returned to Edinburgh for burial in the family plot in the south-east section of Grange Cemetery in Edinburgh.

Family

He was married to Jessie Ann Fergusson Ireland (d.1949).

Publications

Aids to Operative Dentistry (1923)
Ham and jam: Days, doings, diversions, drawings and doggerel ditties of a dentist (1960)

References

1875 births
1966 deaths
Scottish dentists
Fellows of the Royal Society of Edinburgh
Alumni of the University of Edinburgh
Academics of the University of Edinburgh
Fellows of the Royal College of Surgeons of Edinburgh
Writers from Edinburgh
People educated at George Watson's College
Scottish memoirists
Burials at the Grange Cemetery
People in health professions from Edinburgh